John Henry Shumate (born April 6, 1952) is an American former professional basketball player and coach.

Shumate grew up in Elizabeth, New Jersey, and played high school basketball at Thomas Jefferson High School.

A 6'9" forward/center from the University of Notre Dame, Shumate played five seasons (1975–1978; 1979–1981) in the NBA as a member of the Phoenix Suns, Buffalo Braves, Detroit Pistons, Houston Rockets, San Antonio Spurs and Seattle SuperSonics.  He earned NBA All-Rookie Team honors in his first season after averaging 11.3 points per game and 5.6 rebounds per game.  Over the course of his career, Shumate averaged 12.3 points and 7.5 rebounds.  Shumate also appeared as a member of the Detroit team in the cult classic basketball film The Fish That Saved Pittsburgh in 1979 alongside Pistons teammates Bob Lanier, Eric Money, Chris Ford, Kevin Porter, and Leon Douglas.

Shumate later coached for the Southern Methodist University Mustangs and the Phoenix Mercury of the WNBA. He also appeared in a series of basketball training videos. In the summer of 2009 he was named as an assistant coach of the Phoenix Suns.

Shumate was the center on the Notre Dame team that ended UCLA's NCAA-record 88-game winning streak on January 19, 1974.

Head coaching record

College

WNBA

|- 
| align="left" |Phoenix
| align="left" |2003
|34||8||26||||| 7th in Western ||–||–||–||–||
|-class="sortbottom"
| align="center" colspan=2|Career
|34||8||26||||  ||–||–||–|| ||

References

1952 births
Living people
African-American basketball coaches
African-American basketball players
All-American college men's basketball players
American expatriate basketball people in Canada
American men's basketball coaches
American men's basketball players
Basketball coaches from New Jersey
Basketball coaches from South Carolina
Basketball players from New Jersey
Basketball players from South Carolina
Buffalo Braves players
Centers (basketball)
Detroit Pistons players
Grand Canyon Antelopes men's basketball coaches
Houston Rockets players
Notre Dame Fighting Irish men's basketball players
Phoenix Mercury coaches
Phoenix Suns assistant coaches
Phoenix Suns draft picks
Phoenix Suns players
Phoenix Suns scouts
Power forwards (basketball)
San Antonio Spurs players
Seattle SuperSonics players
SMU Mustangs men's basketball coaches
Sportspeople from Elizabeth, New Jersey
Sportspeople from Greenville, South Carolina
Thomas Jefferson High School (New Jersey) alumni
Toronto Raptors assistant coaches
21st-century African-American people
20th-century African-American sportspeople